Alfred Hayes may refer to:

 Alfred Hayes (poet) (1857–1936), British poet; author of school song for King Edward's School, Birmingham
 Alfred Hayes Jr. (1873–1936), American lawyer; Rooseveltian Progressivist
 Alfred Hayes (banker) (1910–1989), American banker; president of Federal Reserve Bank of New York
 Alfred Hayes (writer) (1911–1985), British writer for film and television
 Lord Alfred Hayes (1928–2005), English professional wrestler, manager and commentator
 Alfred Hayes (priest) (died 1937), archdeacon of Calgary